

Plants

Angiosperms

Arthropods

Newly named insects

Conodonts

Newly named conodonts

Archosauromorphs 
 Barnum Brown prospected the Two Medicine Formation, but found nothing significant.
 Lull published a monograph where he discusses AMNH 5244, a ceratopsian braincase.

Newly named dinosaurs 
Data courtesy of George Olshevsky's dinosaur genera list.

Synapsids

Non-mammalian

Footnotes

References
 Makovicky, P. J., 2001, A Montanoceratops cerorhynchus (Dinosauria: Ceratopsia)  braincase from the Horseshoe Canyon Formation of Alberta: In: Mesozoic Vertebrate Life, edited by Tanke, D. H., and Carpenter, K., Indiana University Press,  pp. 243–262.
 Trexler, D., 2001, Two Medicine Formation, Montana: geology and fauna: In:  Mesozoic Vertebrate Life, edited by Tanke, D. H., and Carpenter, K., Indiana University Press, pp. 298–309.

1930s in paleontology
Paleontology 3